Hovasaurus is an extinct genus of diapsid reptile belonging to the order Eosuchia. It lived in what is now Madagascar during the Late Permian and Early Triassic, being a survivor of the Permian–Triassic extinction event and the paleontologically youngest member of the Tangasauridae. Fossils have been found in the Permian Lower and Triassic Middle Sakamena Formations of the Sakamena Group, where it is amongst the commonest fossils. Its morphology suggests an aquatic ecology.

Description 

Hovasaurus resembled a slender lizard, two thirds of total length was taken up by its long tail. It was well adapted to an aquatic life, with the tail being laterally flattened like that of a sea snake. Some stones have been found in the abdomen of fossil Hovasaurus, indicating the creatures swallowed these for ballast, preventing them from floating to the surface when hunting fish.

Paleoenvironment 
The Lower Sakamamena Formation was deposited in a wetland environment situated within a North-South orientated rift valley, perhaps similar to Lake Tanganyika. The climate at the time of deposition was temperate, warm, and humid, with seasonal rainfall and possible monsoons Flora from the formation includes the equisetalean Schizoneura, Glossopteris, and seed fern Lepidopteris. Other vertebrates known from the Lower Sakamena Formation include the palaeoniscoid fish Atherstonia, the procolophonid parareptile Barasaurus, the gliding weigeltisaurid reptile Coelurosauravus, neodiapsids Claudiosaurus, Thadeosaurus, and Acerodontosaurus, fragments of rhinesuchid temnospondyls, an indeteriminate theriodont therapsid and the dicynodont Oudenodon.

References

Further reading 
 
 D. Lambert, D. Naish and E. Wyse 2001, "Encyclopedia of Dinosaurs and prehistoric life", p. 77, Dorling Kindersley Limited, London. 

Prehistoric neodiapsids
Prehistoric reptile genera
Lopingian reptiles of Africa
Early Triassic reptiles of Africa
Changhsingian genus first appearances
Induan genus extinctions
Permian Madagascar
Triassic Madagascar
Fossils of Madagascar
Fossil taxa described in 1926